WIFL-LP/104.5 is a low-power F.M. radio station licensed to Weirsdale, Florida, United States. WIFL-LP is owned by the Lake Weir Chamber of Commerce. It was initially licensed as WHZL-LP on January 12, 2006, changing callsigns to WORJ-LP on November 19, 2010 & changed callsigns again on June 14, 2011 to WIFL-LP. WIFL-LP transmits on 104.5 MHz (Channel 283).

References

External links
 

IFL-LP
IFL-LP
Radio stations established in 2006
2006 establishments in Florida